Désiré Magnus (né Magnus Deutz; 13 June 1828  – 17 December 1883) was a Belgian concert pianist, teacher and composer of salon music who published under the pseudonym D. Magnus.

Biography
Magnus was born in Brussels and studied piano with Georg Jacob Vollweiler (1770–1847) in Heidelberg and also at the Brussels Conservatory, receiving the First Prize in 1843. After several successful concert tours in England, Germany, Russia, Spain and other countries, he settled in Paris, and quickly gained a reputation as pianist, teacher, composer, and music critic.

Magnus' performance on the Steinway concert-grand piano at the Exhibition Universelle of 1867 inspired a lithograph by Amédée de Noé.

He died in Paris.

Selected works
Opera
 La Tolédane (Paris: Salle Taitbout, 1874)

Chamber music
 Les Pleurs de la jeune fille, Nocturne for violin and piano, Op. 13b (1852); original for piano solo
 5ème Nocturne for cello and piano (1877); original version for piano solo
 Duo sur des motifs de l'opéra "Paul et Virginie" de Victor Massé for violin and piano (1877); composed in collaboration with Henri Vieuxtemps

Vocal
 O povero garzon! (G. Duprez), Barcarolle vénetienne, Op. 139 (1874)
 Sur l'océan (Alphonse Labitte) (1878)
 C'est le printemps (A. Labitte) (1880)
 Chanson à boire (Paul Ginisty) (1880)
 Judas, Chant biblique (G. Boyer) (1881)
 Quand reviendra la violette (R. J. Pain) (1881)
 Regrets d'amour, Valse chantée (Paul Armand Silvestre) (1884)

Pedagogical
 24 Études mélodiques et de vélocité dans tous les tons majeurs et mineurs préparation aux difficultés de doigté et de mécanisme que renferment les œuvres des maîtres du piano, anciens et modernes, Op. 190 (1876)
 Méthode élémentaire de piano (1879)

Piano solo
 Bords de l'adour, Polka No. 4, Op. 4
 Un Pensée, Romance-étude, Op. 5
 La Danse du lac bleu, Caprice, Op. 6
 Quadrille über norwegische Melodien in C major, Op. 10
 La Danse des ésprits, Caprice, Op. 12 (1851)
 3 Études de concert (1852)
 Les Pleurs de la jeune fille, Rêverie, Op. 13 (1852); also for violin and piano
 Fantaisie brillante sur l'opéra "La nuit de Noël", Op. 16 (1853); paraphrase on La nuit de Noël by Napoléon Henri Reber
 2 Romances sans paroles, Op. 17
 Saltarelle, Op. 18
 The Gipsy Schottische, Op. 22 (1853)
 The Royal Schottische, Op. 22 (1853)
 Lucie, Schottische, Op. 26 (1853)
 Réminiscences de L'éclair (1859); paraphrase on L'éclair by Fromental Halévy
 La Perle de l'Alhambre (La Perle de l'Exposition), Polka de concert, Op. 30 (1860)
 Souviens-toi, Rêverie, Op. 38
 Les Premiers Litas, Grande valse, Op. 42 (1855)
 3 Pastorales, Op. 43
 Constantinople, Marche, Op. 44
 Tarantelle, Op. 45
 Bolero de salon, Op. 46
 Steeple-Chase, Grand galop de bravoure, Op. 51 (1859)
 Charmes du souvenir, Valse de salon, Op. 52
 Chanson polonaise, Op. 53 (1857)
 Maître corbeau, Variations, Op. 54
 Capriccio alla mazurka, Op. 56 (1859)
 Reminiscences de l'Éclair, Op. 57
 Souvenir du Piémont, Valse brillante, Op. 58 (1860)
 Herculanum de F. David, Grande fantaisie, Op. 59 (1860)
 Trois pastorales (1860)
 Figaro polka, Op. 61 (1860)
 Au gré des flots, Caprice-étude, Op. 62 (1860)
 Die Post, Op. 63
 Marche funèbre, Op. 64 (1860)
 Carnaval napolitain, Op. 65 (1860)
 Un Vœu à la Vièrge, Morceau de genre, Op. 66 (1860)
 Le Rêve d'une mère, Berceuse (1860)
 La Zingara, Polka mazurka (1860)
 Mazurka composée pour le Comte Koucheloff-Besborodko, arrangée pour Piano, Op. 69 (1861)
 1er Nocturne, Op. 70 (1861)
 Souvenir du cocher, Andante religioso, Op. 71
 Chanson du temps passé, Idylle, Op. 73 (1861)
 L'Adieu du pêcheur, Esquisse musicale, Op. 74 (1861)
 Marche des mandarins, Caprice chinois, Op. 76 (1861)
 2ème Nocturne, Op. 77 (1861)
 Harmonie des flots, Caprice-mazurka, Op. 77 (1861)
 La Tarabouka, Caprice moresque, Op. 80 (1862)
 Au printemps, Poésie fugitive, Op. 84
 Fleurs et dentelles, Caprice, Op. 85 (1864)
 Sérénade moscovite, Impromptu
 Lalla-Roukh, Opéra comique de Félicien David, Illustrations pour piano, Op. 88 (1864)
 Fête polonaise, Mazurka, Op. 89 (1863)
 Chants des sirènes, Impromptu, Op. 91
 Alhambra, Polka-mazurka, Op. 92
 Noce arabe, Caprice, Op. 93
 Les Glanenses, Op. 96
 Chant de guerre, Op. 97
 Impromptu-mazurk, Op. 98 (c.1874)
 Polonaise brilliante, Op. 99
 Moïse, Final du 3ème acte, Op. 100
 Marche russe, Op. 101
 José-Maria, opéra-comique de Jules Cohen (c.1866)
 Flûte enchantée, Fantaisie, Op. 105
 Abd-el-Kader, Marche, Op. 106
 L'Addio, Grande valse, Op. 107 (1867)
 Carmosine, Polka-mazurka, Op. 108
 Eole, Valse brillante, Op. 109 (1867)
 Der Freischütz, Fantaisie, Op. 110
 Morceau de salon sur la célèbre valse Indiana de Marcailhou, Op. 112 (1867); paraphrase on Indiana, Grande valse by Gatien Marcailhou
 Freyschütz, de Weber, Fantaisie romantique, Op. 114 (1868)
 Dans les prés, Caprice, Op. 115 (1867)
 Caprice-mazurka, Op. 116
 Impromptu-valse, Op. 117 (1867)
 Patrouille, Ronde de nuit, Op. 118 (1869)
 Dimanche, Étude-vilanelle, Op. 119
 Léopold, Marsch, Op. 120 (1869)
 Berceuse orientale, Op. 121
 Tzigane-marche, Souvenir de Hongrie, Op. 122 (1868)
 Mazurka bohémienne, Op. 123
 Mélancolie, Op. 124 (1869)
 3ème Nocturne, Op. 125 (1869)
 Sperata, Valse poétique, Op. 126
 Le Fuseau (Spindellied), Caprice-étude, Op. 127 (1869)
 Schnell, galop, Morceau facile, Op. 128
 La Madrilena, Mazurka brillante, Op. 129
 Viennoise (Wiener), Mazurka de salon, Op. 130
 Grande sonate en ut mineur, Op. 131 (1868)
 Chanson de l'esclave, Op. 132 (1869)
 Rienzi, opéra de R. Wagner, Fantaisie-militaire, Op. 133 (1869); paraphrase on Rienzi by Richard Wagner
 Cosaque, Polka, Op. 134
 Carnaval de Lima, Caprice hispano-américain, Op. 136 (1870)
 Souvenir de l'exposition, Fantasia sur deux airs nationaux (1871)
 Souvenir de Marseille, Mazurka de salon (1872)
 La Coupe du Roi de Thulé, opéra de E. Diaz, Réminiscences et paraphrase (1873); paraphrase on La Coupe du Roi de Thulé by Eugène-Émile Diaz de la Peña (1837–1901)
 Marche nuptiale, Op. 137
 Fancy Fair, Mazurka de salon, Op. 138
 Carneval-Polka, Op. 139 (1874)
 2ème Sonate in D major, Op. 140 (1874)
 Impromptu, Op. 141
 Salut au Hâvre, Marche solennelle, Op. 142
 Aïda, opéra de G. Verdi, Réminiscences et paraphrase, Op. 144 (1873); paraphrase on Aida by Giuseppe Verdi
 Chant de jeunes filles, Caprice, Op. 145 (1873)
 Fantaisie de salon sur Madame Turlupin, Op. 155; paraphrase on the opera Madame Turlupin by Ernest Guiraud
 1er Nocturne, Op. 159
 Giovinetta, Mazurka, Op. 160
 24 Études de genre dans le style moderne et dans tous les tons, Opp. 161–162 (1874)
 Messe de requiem de G. Verdi, Souvenir, Op. 164 (1874)
 Menuet du temps passé, Op. 165 (1874)
 Marietta, Caprice de genre, Op. 166 (1874)
 Reflets d'azur, Valse de salon, Op. 167 (1875)
 Régiment qui passe, Op. 171
 Capricciosa, Op. 172
 Hip! Hip! Hurrah!, Galop brillant, Op. 173 (1875)
 À la voile, Barcarolle, Op. 174 (1875)
 Page d'album, Impromptu, Op. 175
 Carmencita, Op. 178
 Falstaff, Fantaisie-polka, Op. 179 (1876)
 Pensées d'automne, Impromptu, Op. 181 (1875)
 Le Régiment qui passe, Pas redoublé (1875)
 Marietta, Caprice de genre (1875)
 Capricciosa, Grande valse brillante (1875)
 24 Études de genre dans le style moderne (1875)
 Pensées d'automne, Impromptu (1876)
 Six Sonatinas (1876)
 Souvenir de Prague, Polka, Op. 191 (1876)
 À la Strauss, Polka, Op. 192 (1876)
 Esmek-Meriem (Ton nom, c'est Marie), Chanson arabe (1876)
 Souvenir de Paul et Virginie, opéra de V. Massé, Fantaisie-caprice, Op. 200 (1876)
 5ème Nocturne (1877)
 En rêvant, Valse-caprice (1877)
 Au bal, Impromptu-mazurk, Op. 201 (1877)
 En rêvant, Valse-caprice, Op. 202 (1877)
 Mazurk, Op. 203 (1878)
 Polonaise brillante, Op. 205 (1877)
 Véloce, Caprice-étude, Op. 206
 24 Petite sonatines, très faciles dans tous les tons majeurs et mineurs, Op. 231
 À tire d'aile, Caprice, Op. 235 (1878)
 À toute volée, Galop brillant, Op. 236 (1878)
 Marche bohémienne, Op. 238 (1878)
 Le Hamac, Chanson orientale, Op. 239
 24 Pièces caractéristiques, Op. 240 (1877)
 Chanson de mai, Op. 243 (1878)
 Welcome au Prince de Galles, Valse brillante, Op. 244 (1878)
 Mazurk-Styrienne, Op. 250 (1880)
 Vienne, Ésquisse-valse (1878)
 Welcome au Prince de Galles, Valse brillante (1878)
 L'Étoile du nord, opéra-comique de G. Meyerbeer, Fantaisie de concert, Op. 275 (1878)
 À la mémoire de Beethoven, Hymne funèbre, Op. 302 (1879)
 Grande valse brillante, Op. 303 (1879)
 Aubade, Op. 305 (1879)	
 Souvenir de Fatinitza, opéra comique de F. de Suppé, Fantaisie (1879)
 Souvenirs de Jean de Nivelle, de Delibes, Fantaisie de salon, Op. 308 (1880)
 Chanson mauresque, Op. 312
 Hongroise-polka (1881)
 Les Contes d'Hoffmann, opéra fantastique de J. Offenbach, Barcarolle (1881)
 Dors bébé, Berceuse, Op. 316 (1882)
 Claire fontaine, Caprice, Op. 317 (1882)
 Baiser de fleur, Grande valse de concert, Op. 318 (1883)
 6ème Nocturne (1883)
 Marche des mousquetaires

Sources
 Theodore Baker: A Biographical Dictionary of Musicians, 2nd edition (New York: Schirmer), 1905, p. 371
 John Denison Champlin, Jr.: Cyclopedia of Music and Musicians, volume 2 (New York: Charles Scribner's Sons, 1899), p. 504
 Janet M. Green: The American History and Encyclopedia of Music: Musical Biographies, volume 2, edited by William Lines Hubbard (New York: Irving Squire, 1910), p. 10
 Ernst Pauer: A Dictionary of Pianists and Composers for the Pianoforte (London and New York: Novello, Ewer & Co., 1895), p. 75.

References

External links
 Harp Week Cartoon of the Day “Sudden Mania to Become Pianists …”, August 10, 1867
 

1828 births
1883 deaths
19th-century Belgian male musicians
19th-century classical composers
19th-century classical pianists
Belgian classical composers
Belgian classical pianists
Belgian male classical composers
Composers for piano
Male classical pianists
Musicians from Brussels
Romantic composers
Royal Conservatory of Brussels alumni